New York State Route 70 (NY 70) is a short state highway in the western portion of New York in the United States. It travels through three different counties in just  and is the primary road to and from the village of Canaseraga. The western terminus of the route is at an intersection with NY 436 in the Livingston County town of Portage. Its eastern terminus is at a junction with NY 36 in the Steuben County town of Dansville. Although NY 70 is mostly signed north–south, it follows a more southeast–northwest alignment and is considered an east–west route by the New York State Department of Transportation (NYSDOT). The portion of the route between Dalton and Canaseraga parallels both Canaseraga Creek and the Norfolk Southern Railway's Southern Tier Line.

When the route was assigned as part of the 1930 renumbering of state highways in New York, it continued southeast from Canaseraga to Avoca by way of modern NY 961F and Steuben County's County Route 70A (CR 70A). Additionally, it briefly extended west from Garwoods to Old State Road in Granger. The route was cut back to Garwoods  and to Arkport . By 1977, NY 70 was reconfigured to extend from Portage to a junction east of Canaseraga, replacing part of NY 408 and all of New York State Route 70A and New York State Route 351. Reference markers for all three routes are still posted along NY 70.

Route description
NY 70 is posted as a north–south highway; however, it is inventoried by NYSDOT as an east–west route, reflecting the route's more east–west than north–south alignment. As such, the route officially begins at an intersection with NY 436 in the town of Portage, located in southwestern Livingston County. It initially heads southward across open fields and past small wooded areas before curving to the east about  later. The route continues in this direction for another , intersecting the south end of CR 7 (Hunt Road) and the north end of CR 46 (Oakland Street) before crossing into the town of Nunda. Just east of the town line, NY 70 enters the hamlet of Dalton, where the highway connects to the southern terminus of NY 408 and the northern terminus of CR 24A (State Street) at a junction north of the community's center.

The valley takes the route and the railroad southeastward into Allegany County, where they both pass through the towns of Grove and Burns. As NY 70 runs through the two towns, it serves the railside hamlets of Swain (in Grove) and Garwoods (in Burns), meeting CR 24 in the former and CR 15B in the latter. East of Garwoods, the creek curves to follow a more easterly track, and the valley, NY 70, and the Southern Tier Line all turn eastward to match the change in course.

The route intersects CR 13 and CR 13A (Church Street) in the center of the village before heading into another stretch of open areas east of the community. At this point, the Southern Tier Line heads south to follow NY 961F toward Hornell and Canaseraga Creek turns north toward the Livingston County village of Dansville. NY 70, meanwhile, continues generally eastward toward the Steuben County line, traversing a wide north–south gully that carries NY 36 from Hornell to Dansville. The eastern track eventually gives way to a northeasterly alignment as the highway crosses into Steuben County and its town of Dansville. NY 70 ends just  into the county at an intersection with NY 36 near the eastern edge of the valley in the hamlet of Dotys Corners.

History

The origins of NY 70 date back to the mid-1920s when a series of state highways extending from Belvidere in the west to Penn Yan in the east were designated NY 38. In between the two endpoints, NY 38 served the communities of Garwoods, Canaseraga, Arkport, Hornell, Avoca, and Bath. NY 38 was reassigned to another highway in Central New York as part of the 1930 renumbering of state highways in New York, and its former alignment in the Southern Tier became part of several new routes. Southwest of Garwoods, the highway was included as part of NY 63 from Belvidere to Angelica and NY 63A between Angelica and Garwoods. The portion of old NY 38 northeast of Bath became NY 54.

From Garwoods to NY 2 (now NY 415) south of Avoca, the former routing of NY 38 was included as part of NY 70, which continued west from Garwoods to NY 63 (now Old State Road) in Granger. NY 70 initially used modern NY 961F, NY 36, and Big Creek Road (Steuben County's CR 70A) east of Canaseraga, as did its predecessor, NY 38. West of Garwoods, NY 70 followed Ames Nichols and Swain roads to Spencer Worden Road, from where the route was to continue west to NY 63 by way of an extension of Swain Road. The extension of Swain Road never materialized; as a result, NY 70 was cut back to its junction with NY 63A (now Allegany County's CR 15B) in Garwoods .

Most of what later became NY 70 was given a route designation at some point in the early 1930s. In the 1930 renumbering, the portion of current NY 70 between NY 63 (now NY 408) in Dalton and the then-western terminus of NY 70 in Garwoods was designated as part of NY 63A. By the following year, the remainder of what is now NY 70 west to NY 39 (modern NY 436) was designated NY 351 while the short east–west connector between Canaseraga and Dansville was assigned NY 70A. In the early 1940s, NY 63 was rerouted south of Mount Morris and replaced with NY 408 between Scotts Corners (north of Hinsdale) and Mount Morris. As part of the switch, NY 63A was redesignated NY 408A. NY 408 was rerouted between Angelica and Dalton to follow NY 408A on January 1, 1949.

NY 70 remained unchanged until the 1970s when the route was reconfigured into its modern alignment through a series of changes. The first was made  when the route was truncated westward to Arkport following the completion of the Southern Tier Expressway between Hornell and Avoca. NY 408 was truncated to Dalton on its southern end. The Dalton–Garwoods segment of NY 408's former routing and all of NY 351 became a western extension of NY 70. The route was also realigned on its east end by this time to follow the routing of NY 70A east of Canaseraga.

Major intersections

See also

List of county routes in Steuben County, New York

References

External links

070
Transportation in Allegany County, New York
Transportation in Livingston County, New York
Transportation in Steuben County, New York